Deltiology (from Greek , , diminutive of , , "writing tablet, letter"; and) is the study and collection of postcards. The word was first coined by Professor Randall Rhoades of Ashland, Ohio, in 1945. However, it took about twenty years for it to first appear in a dictionary. Compared to philately, the identification of a postcard's place and time of production can often be an impossible task because postcards, unlike stamps, are produced in a decentralised, unregulated manner. For this reason, some collectors choose to limit their acquisitions to cards by specific artists and publishers, or by time and location.

History
Deltiology appeared at the end of the 19th century, when the mass production of postcards began and received international distribution as the cheapest type of postal items. The first postcard was published in 1869, and by 1875, 231.5 million open letters were sent in the member countries of the Universal Postal Union.

In the late 19th to early 20th centuries the first organizations of deltiologists appeared. Special magazines and catalogs began to be published (in Germany, Austria-Hungary, France, Russia, Great Britain, the United States, Italy, Switzerland, Spain, etc.), international exhibitions took place (in Leipzig, Saint Petersburg, Nice, Paris, Florence, Nuremberg, London, etc.), congresses of collectors and postcard publishers (in Leipzig - 1896, 1910; in Nice - 1899), the first auctions began to be held.

Since the beginning of the 20th century deltiology  has become one of the most popular types of collecting facilitated by the mass production of postcards of diverse topics (geography, ethnography, history, various types of art, technology, sports, portraits, etc.) and of high-quality art and printings, and by postal exchange between countries which expanded significantly with the strengthening of international relations.

The initial views on deltiology were somewhat different from the ones we have today. At the beginning of the 20th century, it was believed that only a postcard that had been mailed, and thus “fulfilled its function”, could be a worthy collectible. Moreover, many collectors would only be interested in a postcard with a view of a city or locality if it had been mailed from that city or locality. A blank postcard without a postmark was equated to a simple “picture”. Today, however, some collectors actually ignore cards with writing on them.

Deltiology is one of the most popular types of collecting. Postcards are usually valued in proportion to their age and rarity of their subject. Recently, an increased demand for postcards has provoked an increase in prices. For example, the price of certain postcards at online auctions can reach $1000, while most postcards would not reach $5.

Identification
There are some general rules to dating when a postcard was printed. Postcards are generally sent within a few years of their printing so the postmark helps date a postcard. If the card is original and not a reprint, a postcard's original printing date can be deduced from such things as the fashions worn by people in the card, the era in which the cars on the street were made, and other time-sensitive clues.  Postcards produced by the Curt Teich Company can be dated more exactly if the stamp box on the reverse is visible, since the company printed a date code within the stamp box.

Picture postcards can be assigned to "the Golden Age of Postcards" (1898–1919), the time of the linens (circa 1930–1950), or to the modern chromes (after 1940). Modern chromes are color photographs and thus differ from photochromes generated from black and white photographs before  1915. Picture postcards can also be differentiated on the basis of other features: undivided backs are typical for c. 1901–1906, and divided backs for c. 1907–1915, while white border cards are common from c. 1915-1930.

Practice
Postcards are collected by historical societies, libraries and genealogical societies because of their importance in research such as how a city looked at a particular time in history as well as social history.  Many elementary schools use postcards to teach children geography.  Postcard pen pal programs have been established to help children in language arts.

Deltiologists, as postcard collectors are called, collect for a variety of reasons. Some are attracted to the postcards themselves, then narrow down their interests. Others are interested in something in particular, such as ballet, then decide to collect ballet-related postcards as a way to augment their interest in ballet.

Collectors may find picture postcards at home in boxes, attics, or scrapbooks, generate their own on trips and vacations, and acquire them from stores, flea markets, purchasing on the Internet, or other collectors.

A number of artists have become recognized for the creation of postcards and certain publishers specialize in the production and printing of picture postcards.

Worldwide popularity 
Worldwide deltiology is the third-largest collecting hobby after stamp collecting and coin/banknote collecting. Postcard clubs may be found in many countries; and these clubs, as well as related organizations, frequently host postcard shows. Online postcard clubs have also become popular. They mainly focus on providing their members with catalogs and features for tracking their collections and interacting with each other.

Some websites popularize deltiology by providing opportunity to receive and send postcards to random people around the world.

Collection storage

There are three most popular ways to store postcards: index card, in albums and in envelopes. Until the 1990s collectors mainly used cardboard albums threading the corners of postcards in the slots. Nowadays plastic photo albums with pockets are used more often, as a postcard can be inserted in the pockets completely. The album storage method ensures the safety of the collection in the best way, plus its visually appealing. However, the disadvantages are that as the collection grows it takes up more space, the collection increases in weight (due to the albums), and the overall cost of all the albums needed to house a collection.

With the index card storage method collections of postcards are located in boxes of the appropriate size. Such boxes can be made by the collector independently from plywood, hardboard and standard shoe boxes. The boundaries of each subsection of the collection are marked with separator cards, which have a format larger than that of the postcard. When it comes to envelopes, a collector can put different postcards in an envelope dividing them by their themes. The main advantages of these methods compared to albums are compactness, money saving, and time saving (reducing the time spent on inserting and rearranging cards in albums). The main disadvantage is that postcards quickly wear out from constant sorting.

See also 
 Postcrossing

Notes

References
 Thomas M. Fürst (Compiler, Author), Rainer von Scharpen (Translation). Picture Postcards - a Bibliography. Supplemented by a History of Deltiology, Schwalmtal, Germany: Phil*Creativ, 2016, 59 pp.

External links 

 Worldwide postcard exchange project
 PostcardTree. 30,000+ digitized and postally used postcards.
  166,000+ Postcard catalog

Postcards
Collecting
1940s neologisms